M.J. Kumheriya (P.G.) College was established in 2004. It is the first college in Rawla Mandi, Sri Ganganagar. It is recognized by the Rajasthan Government. It is a private college.

Courses 
The college offers Bachelor and Master courses in art and science. B.A., M.A.(Geography), B.C.A., M.Sc (Computer Science).

External links
Official site

Colleges in Rajasthan
Education in Sri Ganganagar district
Educational institutions established in 2004
2004 establishments in Rajasthan